Cherax boesemani is a species of crayfish from West Papua in Indonesia (Ajamaru Lakes and the Ajamaru River, which belong to the Kais River drainage and Kepala Burung or Vogelkop Peninsulas). It is popular as a freshwater aquarium pet across Asia, Europe, and North America.

Variable blues, reds, and oranges are the predominant carapace colours, which has led to extensive selective breeding to create new commercial strains, with names such as Blue Moon, Supernova, Papuan red, tricolor and Red Brick. Hybrids with C. pulcher commercially known as Thunderbolt Blue Moon are also available.

References

External links

Parastacidae
Crustaceans of Indonesia
Crustaceans described in 2008
Fauna of Western New Guinea